Backyard is a 2009 Mexican crime film directed by Carlos Carrera.

Plot 
Officer Blanca Bravo (Ana de la Reguera) arrives in Juarez, Mexico to investigate a sequence of killings targeting female migrant workers. But with no help from the locals, bringing the responsible parties to justice becomes a frustrating exercise. As Bravo rails against indifference and local corruption, she finds herself on a collision course with Mickey Santos (Jimmy Smits), a Mexican mogul with a taste for young prostitutes.

Cast 
 Ana de la Reguera as Blanca
 Marco Pérez as Fierro
 Asur Zagada as Juana Sanchez
 Ivan Cortes as Cutberto
 Joaquín Cosío as Peralta
 Alejandro Calva as Comandante
 Jimmy Smits as Mickey Santos
 Carolina Politi as Sara
 Amorita Rasgado as Márgara
 Enoc Leaño as Gobernador
 Adriana Paz as Hilda
 Lisa Owen as Silvia
 Sayed Badreya as El Sultán
 Juan Carlos Barreto as Alvarez

References

External links 
 
 

2000s crime films
Mexican crime films
Films directed by Carlos Carrera
2000s Mexican films